Lac Bleu may refer to:

Lac Bleu d'Ilhéou, a lake in Hautes-Pyrénées, France
Lac Bleu de Lesponne, a lake in Hautes-Pyrénées, France

See also
Blue Lake (disambiguation)
Blausee